Antonio Perry (January 5, 1871 – July 13, 1944) was a justice of the Supreme Court of Hawaii from July 5, 1900 to June 15, 1904, again from May 6, 1909 to April 2, 1914, and a third time from April 17, 1922 to July 3, 1934, serving as chief justice from February 26, 1926 to July 3, 1934.

Early life and education 
Born in Honolulu to Jason and Anna (Henriques) Perry, his father came to Honolulu in 1861 from Faial Island in the Azores, and was Portuguese consul at Honolulu for many years. Perry was educated at old Fort Street School, St. Alban's College, and Punahou School. He read law in the office of Alfred S. Hartwell in 1891, and gained admission to the bar in 1893.

Judicial career 
He was appointed as a district magistrate for Honolulu on September 1, 1894, serving until 1896, when he was elevated to the position of circuit judge for the first circuit. In 1900, he was named an associate justice of the Hawaii Territorial Supreme Court, serving until 1904. He was appointed to the court again from 1909 to 1914, and a third time from 1922 to 1934, serving as chief justice from February 26, 1926 until the end of his service on the court.

Personal life 
Perry married Eugenia May Vanderburgh in San Francisco on January 9, 1912. They had two children, Eugenia Jacqueline and Gail Antonia.

Perry died at The Queen's Medical Center in Honolulu after suffering a fall in his home.

References 

1871 births
1944 deaths
People from Honolulu
People of Azorean descent
Punahou School alumni
U.S. state supreme court judges admitted to the practice of law by reading law
Hawaii lawyers
Justices of the Hawaii Supreme Court
ʻIolani School alumni
Accidental deaths in Hawaii